Nonna Viktorovna Bodrova (17 December 1928, Leningrad, USSR – 31 January 2009, Moscow, Russia) was a Soviet TV presenter, an Honored Artist of the RSFSR (1972), and a laureate of the USSR State Prize (1977). She was one of the first newscasters of the Soviet Central Television and was an announcer of the news program Vremya.

Early life and education 
Nonna Viktorovna Bodrova was born on 17 December 1928 in the city of Leningrad. She graduated from the Moscow Art Theater School in 1956.

Career 
She began working for the Soviet Central Television immediately after graduation. She, along with Igor Kirillov, co-anchored the news program Vremya and was the news frontman of the Soviet Union's state-owned network for all of the nation's pivotal events since the 1950s, covering the annual celebrations of state occasions.

Personal life 
She was married to Boris Bodrov and had only one child, Boris.

Death 
Bodrova died on 31 January 2009 from lung disease. Her remains were buried on Troyekurovskoye Cemetery, Moscow, Russia.

Legacy and honors 
Angelina Vovk, a TV presenter and People's Artist of the Russian Federation commented that Bodrova was "always collected, very strict, rarely smiled, but when she smiled, it was a very kind smile. It was entirely devoted to his work and to his work. She had two lighthouse in life - her family and her son, and her work in the media".

Bodrova was an Honored Artist of the RSFSR. She was also a recipient of USSR State Prize.

References

External links 
 «Время», назад!
 Юбилей Нонны Бодровой.

1928 births
2009 deaths
Recipients of the USSR State Prize
Honored Artists of the RSFSR
Soviet television presenters
Deaths from pulmonary embolism
Radio and television announcers
Burials in Troyekurovskoye Cemetery
Mass media people from Saint Petersburg
Russian women television presenters
Russian television presenters
Russian radio presenters
Russian women radio presenters
20th-century Russian women